Park Hee-jun (born 1971) is a South Korean film director and screenwriter. Park debuted with the fantasy action film Dream of a Warrior (2001) which starred Hong Kong actor Leon Lai.

Filmography 
Dream of a Warrior (2001) - director, screenwriter
Birth of a Man (2002) - director, script editor
Mandate (2008) - director, screenwriter, executive producer
Brothers in Heaven (2018) - director, screenwriter

References

External links 
 
 

1971 births
Living people
South Korean film directors
South Korean screenwriters